Silvanus inarmatus is a species of beetles of the family Silvanidae. It occurs in Sub-Saharan Africa, Madagascar, Seychelles and Cape Verde. It is probably an introduced species in Cape Verde. The species was described by Thomas Vernon Wollaston in 1867.

References

Silvanidae
Beetles of Africa
Beetles described in 1867
Taxa named by Thomas Vernon Wollaston